Laxman Kumar is an Indian cinematographer and film director, who has worked in the Tamil film industry.

Career
Laxman Kumar is an alumnus of Rajiv Menon's Mindscreen Film Institute. After working on several films as a cinematographer, he turned director with the experimental film Masala Padam (2016) starring Bobby Simha and Shiva.

Filmography
Director
 Masala Padam (2015)

Cinematographer
 Vennila Kabadi Kuzhu (2009)
 Nil Gavani Sellathey (2010)
 Kullanari Koottam (2011)
 Paagan (2012)
 Puthagam (2013)
 Thillu Mullu (2013)
 Masala Padam (2015)
 Meen Kuzhambum Mann Paanaiyum (2016)
 Nenjil Thunivirundhal (2017)
 C/O Surya (2017)
Katha Nayagan (2017) 
Silukkuvarupatti Singam (2018)

References

External links
 

Living people
Artists from Chennai
Cinematographers from Tamil Nadu
Film directors from Chennai
Tamil film cinematographers
Tamil film directors
Year of birth missing (living people)